Mili Atoll (Marshallese:) is a coral atoll of 92 islands in the Pacific Ocean, and forms a legislative district of the Ratak Chain of the Marshall Islands. Its total land area is  making it the second largest of the Marshall Islands after Kwajalein. The atoll is separated by a water channel called the Klee Passage from the Knox Atoll which is considerably smaller. The population of Mili Atoll was 738 as of 2011. The main village is also called Mili. Other villages include Nallu, Enejet, Lukonor, Tokewa, and Wau, Mili. Nallu, Enejet and Lukonwor are only accessible from Mili by land during lowtide. Only Mili and Enejet have runways for small aircraft. Mili Airport and Enejit Airport are served by Air Marshall Islands when its aircraft are operational.

History
The British merchant vessel Rolla sighted several islands in the Ratak and Ralik Chains. Captain Cummings sent in a cutter, but the heavy surf prevented it from landing. Rolla had transported convicts from Britain to New South Wales and was on her way to Canton to find a cargo to take back to Britain.

In the early 19th century, Mili and Knox Atolls were designated the Mulgrave Islands by Adam Johann von Krusenstern. In 1823 the mutinous crew of the whaler Globe, out of Nantucket, Massachusetts, brought their ship to Mili Atoll. The mutineers, led by Samuel B. Comstock, had killed Globes captain and her three officers. A few days after she anchored at Mili Atoll, Comstock was murdered by co-mutineer Silas Payne. Six of the crew fled in the ship, leaving nine men stranded on the island. By the time the U.S. schooner , commanded by Lieutenant Commander John Percival, arrived to rescue them two years later, the islanders had killed all but two of the crew members.

The infamous blackbirder Bully Hayes owned Tokowa Islet on Mili during the late 19th century and used it as a base for his operations. Mili Atoll was claimed by the German Empire along with the rest of the Marshall Islands in 1884. The Germans established a trading station and in 1870 a Christian church.

According to some theorists who advocate for the Japanese capture hypothesis of Amelia Earhart, Mili Atoll might have been where Earhart and Fred Noonan landed in 1937 after failing to make it to Howland Island.  Evidence of this actually occurring, however, is largely based on unreliable eyewitness testimony rather than conclusive physical evidence; most historians believe Earhart and Noonan would have had no reason to attempt to come to Mili, and if they had, they would have run out of fuel before making it in any case.

World War II
After World War I, the island came under the South Seas Mandate of the Empire of Japan. Mili housed a radio direction finding beacon and a weather station and the atoll was fortified by the Japanese military. The garrison was composed of 2,045 men of the Imperial Japanese Navy and 2,237 men of the Imperial Japanese Army. In 1942 a seaplane base was developed. Between late 1942 and late 1943, the Japanese also constructed an airfield with three runways (4750 ft, 4550 ft and 4400 ft), and numerous support buildings, including a radar station. The perimeter of the island was fortified with coastal defense and anti-aircraft guns. Between mid-1943 and August 1945, Mili was bombed by United States Navy carrier-based aircraft and shelled by warships. The attacks increased in frequency and severity after Majuro and Kwajalein had fallen to the United States. Of the 5100-man Japanese garrison (2600 Imperial Japanese Navy and 2500 Imperial Japanese Army) only half survived to the end of the war.

Postwar
Following the end of World War II, Mili Atoll came under the control of the United States as part of the Trust Territory of the Pacific Islands. The island has been part of the independent Republic of the Marshall Islands since 1986.

Mili remains littered with thousands of World War II relics.  The law forbids these items from being removed from the island. Mostly what remains are large bunker systems, rail systems, old artillery pieces and remnants of aircraft. Examples include Japanese Mitsubishi A6M Zeros and a North American B-25 Mitchell bomber sitting in just several feet of water. The ground is still covered with craters created by the artillery campaigns that lasted 30 days to "prep" the island for the Allied invasion.

While thousands of unexploded munitions were destroyed by Peace Corps volunteers in the 1960s, danger remains for humans from chemicals in Japanese and U.S. unexploded munitions on land and in the ocean (which could enter the food chain).

Education
Marshall Islands Public School System operates public schools:
 Enejet Elementary School
 Lukonwod Elementary School
 Mili Elementary School
 Nallo Elementary School
 Tokewa Elementary School

Marshall Islands High School on Majuro serves the community.

See also
Attongtonganebwokwbwokw
Naval Base Kwajalein

References

Notes

Bibliography

 Campbell, Mike. Amelia Earhart: The Truth at Last. Mechanicsburg, Pennsylvania: Sunbury Press, 2016. .
 Hussey, Cyrus M. and William Lay.A Narrative of the Mutiny, on Board the Ship Globe, of Nantucket, in the Pacific Ocean, Jan. 1824, And the journal of a residence of two years on the Mulgrave Islands; with observations on the manners and customs of the inhabitants. New London, Connecticut: Wm. Lay and C.M. Hussey, 1828.

External links

 
 Surrender of Mili Atoll in WWII 
 Pacific Wrecks
 WWII sites on Mili Atoll

 
Islands of the Marshall Islands
Ratak Chain